Andrew Nyman (born 13 April 1966) is an English actor, director, writer and magician.

Early life and career
Nyman was born on 13 April 1966 in Leicester, Leicestershire. His first noteworthy performance was in 2000 as Keith Whitehead in Dead Babies, an adaptation of the Martin Amis novel of the same name. Soon after he appeared alongside Jon Voight, David Schwimmer and Leelee Sobieski in Jon Avnet's 2001 Emmy award-winning film Uprising as a Polish-Jewish freedom fighter.

His next film role was in the 2003 film Coney Island Baby as a gay French gun dealer. In 2006 he appeared in horror-comedy Severance, Herman Brood biopic Wild Romance and British romcom Are You Ready for Love?. That same year Nyman won the award for best actor at the 2006 Cherbourg-Octeville Festival of Irish & British Film for his role as Colin Frampton in Shut Up and Shoot Me. In 2007, Nyman appeared as one of the leads in the Frank Oz film Death at a Funeral, starring opposite Matthew Macfadyen, Ewen Bremner and Keely Hawes. In 2008, he starred as Patrick, a sleazy reality show producer, in Charlie Brooker's E4 horror satire Dead Set, and appeared in BBC Four's supernatural drama series Crooked House.

He portrayed the recurring character Jonty de Wolf in Channel 4's semi-improvised show Campus. In 2013, Nyman appeared in Kick-Ass 2,  as "The Tumor." He did voice over work for the series Sarah & Duck and Chuggington, and portrayed a young Winston Churchill in the BBC drama Peaky Blinders.  In 2014 Nyman played the role of Charles Guiteau in the Stephen Sondheim musical Assassins at the Menier Chocolate Factory, and appeared in the film Automata with Antonio Banderas and Dylan McDermott.

In 2014, Nyman was one of 200 public figures who were signatories to a letter to The Guardian opposing Scottish independence in the run-up to September's referendum on that issue.

Work with Derren Brown
As an accomplished magician and mentalist, Nyman has frequently collaborated with psychological illusionist Derren Brown. He is the co-creator and co-writer of the television shows Derren Brown – Mind Control and Trick of the Mind. He and Brown wrote Russian Roulette, Séance, and Messiah, as well as three series of Trick of the Mind. He also co-wrote and co-directed four of Brown's stage shows, all of which have toured and played the West End. For Something Wicked This Way Comes they were awarded the 2006 Olivier Award for Best Entertainment.

Their fourth show Enigma was also nominated for Olivier Award 2010, and he was nominated for the Lew Grade Award at the 2007 BAFTA Awards for his work on Derren Brown: The Heist (alongside collaborators Derren Brown, Simon Mills and Ben Caron). Nyman shares some of his magic "know-how" in the DVD, Insane. Their latest collaboration is entitled Sacrifice, which opened in March 2015 in the UK, and was premiered on Netflix in 2018.

Ghost Stories
Nyman is co-creator of the long-running horror stage-play Ghost Stories.  The show opened at the Liverpool Playhouse on 4 February 2010; from there it moved to the Lyric Theatre Hammersmith, before transferring to the Duke of York's Theatre in the West End, opening on 25 June 2010.

Since then it has played in Moscow and Toronto, and was nominated for two Olivier Awards in 2011, Best Sound and Best Entertainment. Nyman and Jeremy Dyson co-wrote the show and co-directed it along with Sean Holmes. The stage play Ghost Stories finished after 1,000 shows in the Duke of York's, on 15 March 2015.

A film adaptation premiered in 2017, starring Nyman, Paul Whitehouse, and Martin Freeman.

Personal life
Nyman is Jewish, and attended Chai Summer Camp.

Credits

Television
 The Bill as various characters (1989-1995)
 The Woman in Black as Jackie (1989) (TV film)
 Five Children and It as Baker's Boy (1991)
 Archer's Goon as Museum attendant (1992)
 New Voices as Jim (1995)
 EastEnders as Neil Kaplan (1997)
 Uprising as Calel Wasser (2001) (TV film)
 Chuggington as Chatsworth and Dunbar (2008)
 Dead Set as Patrick (2008)
 Crooked House as Nicholas Duncalfe (2008)
 Campus as Jonty de Wolfe (2009–2011)
 Olly the Little White Van as Jethro, Royston, Mick, Bertie and other voices (2011)
 Stargazing Live as himself (2012)
 Sarah & Duck as Bag and Cake (2013)
 Peaky Blinders as Winston Churchill (2013)
 Psychobitches as Various characters (2014)
 Ballot Monkeys as Gerry Stagg (2015)
 The Eichmann Show as David Landor (2015) (TV film)
 Shaun the Sheep: The Farmer's Llamas as Nuts (2015) (TV special)
 Shaun the Sheep as Nuts (2016)
 Hanna as Jacobs (2019)
Unforgotten as Dean Barton (series 4; 2021)
 The Capture as Home Secretary Rowan Gill (series 2; 2022)

Film
 Dead Babies as Keith (2000)
 Coney Island Baby as Franko (2003)
 Shut Up and Shoot Me as Colin (2005)
 Severance as Gordon (2006)
 Wild Romance as Leo Leitner (2006)
 Played as Danny (2005)
 Are You Ready for Love? as Barry Schneider (2007)
 Death at a Funeral as Howard (2007)
 The Tournament as Tech Eddie (2009)
 Black Death as Dalywag (2010)
 Glass Man as Martin Pritte (2011)
 Kick-Ass 2 as The Tumor (2013)
 Autómata (2014)
 Shaun the Sheep Movie as Nuts (2015)
 Minions as Additional Voices (2015)
 Despicable Me 3 as Clive (2017)
 Ghost Stories as Professor Phillip Goodman (2017)
 Star Wars: The Last Jedi as Jail Guard (2017)
 The Commuter as Tony (2018)
 Judy as Dan (2019)
 A Shaun the Sheep Movie: Farmageddon as Nuts (2019)
 Jungle Cruise as Sir James Hobbs-Cunningham (2021)

Theatre
 Abigail's Party as Lawrence (2012)
 Assassins as Charles Guiteau (2014-2015)
 Hangmen as Syd (2015-2016)
 Fiddler on the Roof as Tevye (2018-2019)
 Hello, Dolly! as Horace Vandergelder (2020-2021)

Awards and nominations

Theatre

Other 
2006 - Cherbourg-Octeville Festival of Irish and British Film - Best Actor - Shut Up and Shoot Me
 2008 - Member of the Inner Magic Circle

References

External links 
 
 
 

1966 births
Living people
20th-century English male actors
21st-century English male actors
English Jews
English male film actors
English male television actors
English male voice actors
Magic consultants
Male actors from Leicestershire
People from Leicester